Sir George Fairbairn (23 March 1855 – 23 October 1943) was a pastoralist and Australian politician.

Fairbairn was born in Geelong, Victoria and educated at Geelong Grammar School and Jesus College, Cambridge. He rowed for Jesus College Boat Club in 1875 and 1876, the first two years of an 11-year stretch up to 1885 when it won the Cambridge head of the river races. His younger brother Steve went on to become an influential rowing coach at the club. Fairbairn returned to Australia in 1876 and in the following years managed Peak Downs and Barcaldine stations in Queensland. He married Jessie Kate Prell in November 1880 and they had a son and a daughter. In 1890, he took over the family farm at Lara, Victoria and subsequently acquired other farms in Victoria and New South Wales and developed numerous business interests.  He was president of the Employers' Federation of Australia for six years.

In 1903 Fairbairn was elected to the Victorian Legislative Assembly seat of Toorak which he held until 1906 when he resigned to contest the newly created seat of Fawkner in the Australian House of Representatives. Fairbairn won Fawkner at the 1906 election. Fairbairn was endorsed by the Anti-Socialists, but campaigned as an independent Protectionist. He did not sit with the Anti-Socialists.

In 1909, he helped create the union of the non-Labor parties into the "fusion" He lost Fawkner in the 1913 election, following an adverse electoral redistribution, but he was elected to the Senate from 1917 election, but did not stand for re-election at the 1922 election.

Fairbairn's first wife died in 1921 and he married Lorna Bessie in 1924.  He was Agent-General for Victoria in London from 1924 to 1927. He was knighted in 1926. He was survived by his second wife and his son, Clive Prell Fairbairn. He was grandfather of David Fairbairn, member for Farrer from 1949 to 1975 and government minister from 1962 to 1972. He was uncle of James Fairbairn, a Minister for Civil Aviation from 1939 until his death in a plane crash in 1940.

References

Victoria (Australia) state politicians
Members of the Australian House of Representatives for Fawkner
Members of the Australian House of Representatives
Independent members of the Parliament of Australia
Commonwealth Liberal Party members of the Parliament of Australia
Members of the Australian Senate for Victoria
Members of the Australian Senate
Nationalist Party of Australia members of the Parliament of Australia
Australian Knights Bachelor
Alumni of Jesus College, Cambridge
1855 births
1943 deaths
Agents-General for Victoria
20th-century Australian politicians
People educated at Geelong Grammar School